Mehmet Emin Toprak (11 September 1974 – 2 December 2002) was a Turkish film actor.

Toprak starred in the critically acclaimed 2002 film Uzak. He died in a car crash on the way back from the Ankara Film Festival, near the town of Çan at the age of 28 years.

A few weeks after the accident, the film Uzak was shown in the 2003 Cannes Film Festival, where Toprak was posthumously awarded Best Actor.

Personal life 
Toprak collaborated with his cousin Nuri Bilge Ceylan in his films. He was newlywed at the time of his death.

Filmography
Kasaba (The Small Town, 1997)
Mayıs Sıkıntısı (Clouds of May, 1999)
Uzak (Distant, 2002)

Awards and nominations

References

1974 births
2002 deaths
Turkish male film actors
Cannes Film Festival Award for Best Actor winners
Road incident deaths in Turkey